Silverdale is a census-designated place (CDP) in Kitsap County, Washington, in the United States. The population was 20,733 at the 2020 census. Despite many attempts at incorporation, Silverdale remains an unincorporated community.

Silverdale ranks 158th among 522 areas in Washington for which per capita income data is collected.

Geography
Silverdale is located on the Kitsap Peninsula at  (47.659410, -122.676630). Silverdale lies at the north tip of Dyes Inlet, which connects it to Bremerton via Sinclair Inlet and to the Pacific Ocean via Port Orchard and Puget Sound.

Demographics

As of the census of 2020, there were 20,733 people, and 8,351 households (2017-2021). The population density was 1,641.2 people per square mile (2641.25/km2). The racial makeup of the CDP in 2020-2021 was 66.8% White, 9.7% Asian, 5.8% Black Or African American, 0.4% American Indian and Alaska Native, 0.3% Native Hawaiian and Other Pacific Islander, 7.3% Hispanic or Latino, and 12.2%% from two or more races.

As of 2021, of the 8,351 households in Silverdale, the age breakdown by percentage was 6.1% under 5 years old, 20.5% under 18 years, and 16.9% over the age of 65. 49.5 of the population was female. The average family size was 2.53 people.

The median income for a household in the CDP between 2017-2021 was $87,558. The per capita income for the CDP was $42,024. About 7.4% of the population was below the poverty line.

Commerce

Commerce in Silverdale is primarily divided into two geographic areas: Old Town Silverdale along the northeast edge of Dyes Inlet, and the Kitsap Mall and big box stores (Costco Wholesale Center, WinCo Foods, Safeway, Grocery Outlet, Trader Joe's, Hobby Lobby,Michaels, Jo-Ann Stores Fabric and Crafts, Home Depot, Lowe's, Harbor Freight Tools, Barnes & Noble, REI, Sportsman's Warehouse, Macy's, Best Buy, Target, PetSmart, and T.J. Maxx) just north within SR 3 and SR 303.  In addition to the Port of Silverdale, Old Town Silverdale is home to many salons, restaurants, and medical offices.

Education

Public schools 
Central Kitsap School District serves about 11,243 students from kindergarten through grade 12 (2022-2023). The district has two high schools serving grades 9 to 12, one secondary school serving grades 7 to 12, three middle schools serving grades six to eight, three satellite programs, 12 elementary schools, and a home-school support program.  In addition, the district offers both junior high- and high school-level alternative programs. The overall graduation rate as of 2021-2022 is 87%, above the statewide rate of 82%.

On September 8, 2017, construction began on the new Central Kitsap Campus which will house Central Kitsap High School and Central Kitsap Middle School. The current buildings were built in 1942 and 1959 respectively.  It is expected that middle school students will be able to move into the new building in Spring 2019 while high school students will move in Fall 2019.  Construction for the new campus was contracted through Skanksa for $77.9 million.  Central Kitsap School District sold the naming rights to the new campus' stadium to Kitsap Credit Union for $500,000.  The stadium will be named "Kitsap Credit Union Athletic Complex."

Health
A branch of what was then, Harrison Medical Center, now St. Michael Medical Center, opened on Myhre Road in 2000. St. Michael Medical Center is a part of Virginia Mason Franciscan Health, under Catholic Health Initiatives (CHI). A new expansion to St. Michael Medical Center was completed and opened to the public in December 2020. The hospital features a Level III Trauma Center and helipad, birth center, and cancer care. St. Michael Medical Center is in America's 50 Best Hospitals for cardiac surgery (2021).

St. Michael Medical Center is the only one of two hospitals on the Kitsap Peninsula, St. Anthony Hospital in Gig Harbor, Washington, being the other. In 2022 staffing issues have been a major ongoing issue at the hospital.

Notable people
 Tarn Adams, creator of Dwarf Fortress
 John Coker, former NBA center, graduated from Olympic High School
 Ben Gibbard, vocalist and guitarist for the band Death Cab For Cutie, graduated from Olympic High School
 Mike Herrera, vocalist and bass guitarist for the band MxPx, graduated from Central Kitsap High School
 Steven Holl, world-renowned architect, graduated from Bremerton High School
 Todd Linden, MLB outfielder for the Cleveland Indians, graduated from Central Kitsap High School
 Christian Welp, former NBA center, graduated from Olympic High School

References

External links

 
 Silverdale Chamber of Commerce
 

Census-designated places in Kitsap County, Washington
Census-designated places in Washington (state)